Green nails may be (1) due to a Pseudomonas aeruginosa infection causing a green nail syndrome or (2) the result of copper in tap water.

Pseudomonas aeruginosa

Pseudomonas aeruginosa  is a common bacterium that can cause disease in animals, including humans. It is found in soil, water, skin flora, and most man-made environments throughout the world. It thrives not only in normal atmospheres, but also in hypoxic atmospheres, and has, thus, colonized many natural and artificial environments. It uses a wide range of organic material for food; in animals, the versatility enables the organism to infect damaged tissues or those with reduced immunity. The symptoms of such infections are generalized inflammation and sepsis. If such colonizations occur in critical body organs, such as the lungs, the urinary tract, and kidneys, the results can be fatal. Because it thrives on most surfaces, this bacterium is also found on and in medical equipment, including catheters, causing cross-infections in hospitals and clinics. It is implicated in hot-tub rash. It is also able to decompose hydrocarbons and has been used to break down tarballs and oil from oil spills.

See also
 Nail anatomy
 List of cutaneous conditions

References

Conditions of the skin appendages